Abdiaziz District, also spelled Abdi Asis District, is a district in the southeastern Banaadir region of Somalia. It includes a part of the old town of Mogadishu.

References

Districts of Somalia
Administrative map of Abdi-Aziz District

Districts of Somalia
Banaadir